Himerarctia is a genus of moths in the family Erebidae. The genus was described by Watson in 1975.

Taxonomy 
 Himerarctia docis (Hübner, [1831])
 Himerarctia griseipennis (Rothschild, 1909)
 Himerarctia laeta Watson, 1975
 Himerarctia viridisignata Watson, 1975

References

External links

Phaegopterina
Arctiinae of South America
Moth genera